Bovina is a census-designated place and unincorporated community located about  east of Vicksburg in Warren County, Mississippi, on Interstate 20. It is part of the Vicksburg Micropolitan Statistical Area.

It was first named as a CDP in the 2020 Census which listed a population of 516.

Demographics

2020 census

Note: the US Census treats Hispanic/Latino as an ethnic category. This table excludes Latinos from the racial categories and assigns them to a separate category. Hispanics/Latinos can be of any race.

References

Unincorporated communities in Warren County, Mississippi
Unincorporated communities in Mississippi
Census-designated places in Warren County, Mississippi